Vermont-Slauson is a 1.44-square-mile neighborhood  within the South Los Angeles region of Los Angeles, California.

Geography

The Vermont-Slauson neighborhood touches Vermont Square on the north,  Florence on the east, Vermont Knolls on the south and Harvard Park on the west. It is bounded by 54th Street on the north, the Interstate 110 Freeway on the east, Florence Avenue on the south and Western Avenue on the west.

Demographics
It is notable within the city for its high density of population, its relatively mid to low household income, its youthful population, its high average household size and the percentage of its families headed by single parents.

A total of 26,797 residents lived in Vermont-Slauson's 1,44 square miles, according to the 2000 U.S. census — averaging 18,577 people per square mile, among the highest population densities in both the city and the county.

The median age was 25, young for the city and the county, and the percentages of residents younger than age 18 were among the county's highest. There were 1,370 families headed by single parents; the rate of 24.8% was considered high for both the city and the county.

Within the neighborhood, Latino made up 60.5% of the population, while African American were 36.8%. Other ethnicities are White 2.3%; Asian, 0.3%; and other, 1%. Mexico and El Salvador were the most common places of birth for the 39.2% of the residents who were born abroad, about an average percentage for the city as a whole.

The median household income in 2008 dollars was $31,236, considered low for both the city and county. The percentage of households earning $20,000 or less was high, compared to the county at large. The average household size of 3.5 people was also considered high. Renters occupied 61.5% of the housing units, and homeowners occupied the rest.

Recreation and parks
 Mount Carmel Park, Hoover Street between 69th and 70th Street
 Theresa Lindsay Park, Figueroa Street at Slauson Avenue

Education
Only 3.7% of Vermont-Slauson residents 25 and older held a four-year degree, a low percentage for both the city and the county. The percentage of residents age 25 and older with less than a high school diploma was high for the county.

Schools within the boundaries of Vermont-Slauson are:

 Augustus F. Hawkins High School (LAUSD), 825 W. 60th Street
 John Muir Middle School (LAUSD), 5929 South Vermont Avenue
 Nativity Elementary School (private), 943 West 57th Street
 Budlong Avenue Elementary (LAUSD), 5940 South Budlong Avenue
 Sixty-First Street Elementary School (LAUSD), 6020 South Figueroa Street
 Sixty-Eighth Street Elementary School (LAUSD), 612 West 68th Street
 Saint Raphael Elementary School (private), 924 West 70th Street

References

External links
  Comments about living in Vermont-Slauson
  Vermont-Slauson crime map and statistics

Neighborhoods in Los Angeles
South Los Angeles